Place name changes in Turkey have been undertaken, periodically, in bulk from 1913 to the present by successive Turkish governments. Thousands of names within the Turkish Republic or its predecessor the Ottoman Empire have been changed from their popular or historic alternatives in favour of recognizably Turkish names, as part of Turkification policies. The governments have argued that such names are foreign or divisive, while critics of the changes have described them as chauvinistic. Names changed were usually of Armenian, Greek, Georgian, Laz, Bulgarian, Kurdish (Zazaki), Syriac or Arabic origin.

Turkey's efforts to join the European Union in the early 21st century have led to a decrease in the incidence of such changes from local government, and the central government even more so. In some cases legislation has restored the names of certain villages (primarily those housing Kurdish and Zaza minorities). Place names that changed formally have frequently persisted in local dialects and languages throughout the ethnically diverse country.

This policy began during the final years of the Ottoman Empire and continued into its successor, the Turkish Republic. Under the Kemalist government, specialized governmental commissions were created for the purpose of changing names. Approximately 28,000 topographic names were changed, which included 12,211 village and town names, and 4,000 mountain, river, and other topographic names. Most name changes occurred in the eastern regions of the country where minority ethnicities form a large part or a majority of the population.

History

Ottoman Empire 
The Committee of Union and Progress took the reins of the Ottoman government through a coup d'état in 1913. At the height of World War I and during the final years of the Ottoman Empire, when the ethnic cleansing policies of non-Muslim Greek, Armenian, and Assyrian minorities were underway, Minister of War Enver Pasha issued an edict (ferman) on October 6, 1916, declaring:

Enver Pasha did not change the geographical names belonging to Muslim minorities (i.e. Arabs and Kurds) due to the Ottoman government's role as a Caliphate. His decree inspired many Turkish intellectuals to write in support of such measures. One such intellectual, Hüseyin Avni Alparslan (1877–1921), a Turkish soldier and author of books about Turkish language and culture, was inspired by the efforts of Enver Pasha, writing in his book Trabzon İli Lâz mı? Türk mü? (Is the Trabzon province Laz or Turkish?) that:

It is not known how many geographical names were changed under the ordinance. The ultimate overarching objective behind it failed due to the collapse of the Ottoman government and trials of its leaders before Ottoman and European courts for massacres against ethnic minorities committed in 1915.

A decreased level of cultural repression has taken place in the Turkish Republic; however, non-mainstream Turkic origin place names have invariably been officially renamed over the course of time.

Republic of Turkey 
Turkish nationalism and secularism were two of the six founding principles of the Turkish Republic. Mustafa Kemal Atatürk, the leader of the early decades of the Republic, aimed to create a nation state (Turkish: Ulus) from the Turkish remnants of the Ottoman Empire. During the first three decades of the Republic, efforts to Turkify geographical names were a recurring theme. Imported maps containing references to historical regions such as Armenia, Kurdistan, or Lazistan (the official name of the province of Rize until 1921) were prohibited (as was the case with Der Grosse Weltatlas, a map published in Leipzig).

By 1927, all street and square names in Istanbul which were not of Turkish origin were changed. 

In 1940 the Ministry of Internal Affairs (MoIA) issued a circular which called for original or foreign language place names to be substituted with Turkish place names. Journalist and writer Ayşe Hür has noted that after the death of Atatürk and during the Democratic period of the Turkish Republic in the late 1940s and 50s, "ugly, humiliating, insulting or derisive names, even if they were Turkish, were subjected to changes. Village names with lexical components meaning red (kızıl), bell (çan), church (kilise, e.g. Kirk Kilise) were changed. To do away with "separatist notions", the Arabic, Persian, Armenian, Kurdish, Georgian, Tatar, Circassian, and Laz village names were also changed." 

The Special Commission for Name Change (Ad Değiştirme İhtisas Kurulu) was created in 1952 under the supervision of the Ministry of the Interior. It was invested with the power to change all names that were not within the jurisdiction of the municipalities like streets, parks or places. In the commission were representatives from the Turkish Language Society (Türk Dil Kurumu), from the faculties geography, language and history from the Ankara University, the Military General Staff and the ministries of Defense, Internal Affair and education. The committee was working until 1978 and 35% of the villages in Turkey got their names changed. The initiative proved successful, as approximately 28,000 topographic names were changed, including 12,211 village and town names and 4,000 mountain, river, and other topographic names. This figure also included names of streets, monuments, quarters, neighborhoods, and other components that make up certain municipalities.
The committee was reinstated after the military coup of 1980 in 1983 and it changed the names of 280 villages. It was closed again in 1985 due to inefficiency. During the heightened tension between Kurdish rebels and the Turkish government, the focus of geographical name changing in the 1980s was on Kurdish villages, towns, rivers.etc.

In 1981, the Turkish government stated in the preface of Köylerimiz, a publication dedicated to names of Turkish villages, that:

At the culmination of the policy, no geographical or topographical names of non-Turkish origin remained. Some of the newer names resembled their native names, but with revised Turkish connotations (i.e. Aghtamar was changed to Akdamar).

Current status 
Although geographical names have been formally changed in Turkey, their native names persist and continue in local dialects throughout the country. At times, Turkish politicians have also used the native names of cities during their speeches. In 2009, when addressing a crowd in the town of Güroymak, president Abdullah Gül used the native name Norşin. Also that year, when talking about his family origins, Prime Minister Recep Tayyip Erdoğan used the native Greek name of Potamya instead of Güneysu.

Efforts at restoring the former names of geographical terms have been recently introduced in Turkey. In September 2012, legislation was introduced to restore the names of (primarily Kurdish) villages to their former native names. According to the bill, the province of Tunceli would be named Dersim, Güroymak would be named Norşin, and Aydınlar would be named Tilo. But the Turkish Government authority was opposed to the name Dersim as the local municipality wanted to introduce the name Dersim for Tunceli.

Comparative analysis
Most of the geographical name changes occurred in the eastern provinces of the country and on the coast of the eastern Black Sea, where minority populations tend to live. Through independent study, etymologist Sevan Nişanyan estimates that, of the geographical location name changes, 4,200 were Greek, 4,000 Kurdish, 3,600 Armenian, 750 Arabic, 400 Assyrian, 300 Georgian, 200 Laz, and 50 others. The official statistics of The Special Commission for Name Change (Ad Degistirme Ihtisas Komisyonu) claim that the total number of villages, towns, cities, and settlements renamed is 12,211. The chart below lists the provinces and the number of villages or towns renamed.

Notable geographical name changes

Armenian 

Armenian geographic names were first changed under the reign of Sultan Abdul Hamid II. In 1880, the word Armenia was banned from use in the press, schoolbooks, and governmental establishments, to be replaced with words like Anatolia or Kurdistan. Armenian name changing continued under the early Republican era up until the 21st century. It included the Turkification of last names, change of animal names, change of the names of Armenian historical figures (i.e. the name of the prominent Balyan family was concealed under the identity of a superficial Italian family called Baliani), and the change and distortion of Armenian historical events.

Most Armenian geographical names were in the eastern provinces of the Ottoman empire. Villages, settlements, or towns that contain the suffix -kert, meaning built or built by (i.e. Manavazkert (today Malazgirt), Norakert, Dikranagert, Noyakert), -shen, meaning village (i.e. Aratashen, Pemzashen, Norashen), and -van, meaning town (i.e. Charentsavan, Nakhichevan, Tatvan), signify an Armenian name. Throughout Ottoman history, Turkish and Kurdish tribesmen have settled into Armenian villages and changed the native Armenian names (i.e. the Armenian Norashen was changed to Norşin). This was especially true after the Armenian genocide, when much of eastern Turkey was depopulated of its Armenian population.

Sevan Nişanyan estimates that 3,600 Armenian geographical locations have been changed.

Assyrian 
Most Assyrian name changes occurred in the southeast of Turkey near the Syrian border in the Tur Abdin region. The Tur Abdin is a hilly region incorporating the eastern half of Mardin Province, and Şırnak Province west of the Tigris, on the border with Syria. The name 'Tur Abdin' is from the Syriac language meaning 'mountain of the servants (of God)'. Tur Abdin is of great importance to Syriac Orthodox Christians, for whom the region used to be a monastic and cultural heartland. The Assyrian/Syriac people of Tur Abdin call themselves Suroye and Suryoye, and traditionally speak an Eastern Aramaic dialect called Turoyo.

After the Assyrian genocide, the Assyrians of the region were either depopulated or massacred. Currently, there are 5, 000 Assyrians living in the region.

Nişanyan estimates that 400 Assyrian geographical locations have been changed.

Georgian and Laz 

The historical region of Tao-Klarjeti, which includes the modern provinces of Artvin, Rize, Ardahan and the northern part of Erzurum, has long been the center of Georgian culture and religion. Lazistan and Tao-Klarjeti, then part of the Georgian Principality of Samtskhe, was conquered by the Ottoman Empire in the middle of the 16th century. Due to linguistic differences, the new Ottoman administration in his  (Province of Georgia) adapted Georgian geographical names in Ottoman-Turkish style. Some geographical names were changed so drastically that it has become almost impossible to determine its original form. Geographical name changes by the Ottomans became intense in 1913. After the collapse of the Ottoman Empire in 1923, the new Turkish government continued old policy. The first attempts by Turkish republican officials to change Georgian geographical names began in 1925. The changes in geographical names periodically took place after 1959 and continued throughout of 20th century. Despite the fact that Georgians were making significant minority in the region, in 1927 the provincial council of Artvin banned Georgian language. The inhabitants however retained usage of old geographical names in colloquial speech.

Between 1914 to 1990, Turkish semi-autonomous bureaucratic regimes changed 33% geographical names in Rize and 39% in Artvin.

Nişanyan estimates that 500 Georgian and Laz geographical names have been changed to Turkish .

Greek 
Many of the Greek names have maintained their origins from the Byzantine empire and Empire of Trebizond era.

With the establishment of the Ottoman empire, many Turkish name changes have continued to retain their Greek origins. For example, the modern name "İzmir" derives from the former Greek name Σμύρνη "Smyrna", through the first two syllables of the phrase "εις Σμύρνην" (pronounced "is Smirnin"), which means "to Smyrna" in Greek. A similar etymology also applies to other Turkish cities with former Greek names, such as İznik (from the phrase "is Nikaean", meaning "to Nicaea"), or even for the Greek island of Kos, called "İstanköy" in Turkish.

Nişanyan estimates that 4,200 Greek geographical locations have been changed, the most of any ethnic minority.

Kurdish 
The Kurdish (and Zaza) geographical name changes were exempt under the Ottoman Empire due to the Islamic religious orientation of Kurds. During the Republican era and especially after the Dersim massacre, Kurdish geographical name changes became more common. During the Turkish Republican era, the words Kurdistan and Kurds were banned. The Turkish government had disguised the presence of the Kurds statistically by categorizing them as Mountain Turks. This classification was changed to the new euphemism of Eastern Turk in 1980.

Nişanyan estimates that 4,000 Kurdish (and Zaza) geographical locations have been changed.

See also 
List of renamed cities, towns and regions in Turkey
Animal name changes in Turkey
Replacement of loanwords in Turkish
Geographical renaming
Geographical regions of Turkey
Denial of Kurds by Turkey

References

Bibliography

External links 
Osmanlı Yer Adları, Ankara 2017, a cross-listing of modern, Ottoman, and other historical place names in the Ottoman Empire (both within and outside modern Turkey)
Index Anatolicus: Map of Geographical locations of Anatolia with descriptions, etymology, and cultural origins (Turkish)
List of Istanbul street name changes (Turkish)

Turkish nationalism
Turkish culture
Place name etymologies
Names of places in Turkey
Society of Turkey
Discrimination in Turkey
Turkey